Harry Alvin Duncan (19 April 1916 Keokuk, Iowa – 18 April 1997 Omaha, Nebraska) was a hand-press printer, author, librettist, translator, and publisher under his imprint the Cummington Press. He was known for publishing early works by Robert Lowell, Tennessee Williams, Wallace Stevens, Allen Tate, Marianne Moore, William Logan, Stephen Berg, and Dana Gioia. A 1982 Newsweek article about the rebirth of the hand press movement said that Duncan was "considered the father of the post-World War II private-press movement."

Career 
Harry Duncan was born in Keokuk, Iowa and earned a bachelor's degree in English in 1938 from Grinnell College intending to become a poet. He enrolled in the English graduate program at Duke University, but never completed his master's degree. During graduate school he spent summers at the independent Cummington School of the Arts. While in Massachusetts he began publishing books of contemporary poetry using a hand press. He eventually chose to focus on letterpress printing instead of a graduate degree. The first Cummington Press book was published in 1939.

Duncan became director of the typographical laboratory at the University of Iowa's School of Journalism and moved the Cummington Press to Iowa City in 1956. In 1972, he moved to the University of Nebraska at Omaha (UNO) and began the university's fine arts press, Abattoir Editions, and taught. He retired from teaching in 1985 and returned to printing books full-time under the Cummington Press imprint. Duncan died on April 18, 1997, in Omaha, Nebraska.

Marking the centenary of his birth, the Fall 2016 issue of Parenthesis included a portrait of Harry Duncan on its cover along with three articles by or about Duncan: the text of his talk "New England Novitiate," "An Apprentice's Story" by Juan Nicanor Pascoe, and "A Checklist of Printed Work, 1939-1997" by Michael Peich and Denise Brady.

References

External links
The Cummington Press and Abattoir Editions : a descriptive bibliography of the presswork of Harry Duncan, 1939–1985, Mel Bohn, 1986. Dissertation: Ph. D. University of Nebraska—Lincoln 1986.
The Cummington Press, Mary L. Richmond, From Books at Iowa 7 (November 1967).
"Reflections in Time: Harry Duncan, interview, University of Nebraska at Omaha.
Cummington Press Papers, The University of Iowa Libraries, Iowa City, Iowa.
Cummington Press records and Harry Duncan papers, Stuart A. Rose Manuscript, Archives, and Rare Book Library, Emory University.
Mary L. Richmond Cummington Press Collection, Archives & Special Collections, Criss Library, University of Nebraska at Omaha.
Abattoir Editions Collection, Archives & Special Collections, Criss Library, University of Nebraska at Omaha.
The Cummington Press 1939–1997, Harry Duncan (1916–1997).
Harry Duncan Flickr photo collection, University of Nebraska at Omaha Criss Library. 
A Conversation With Guy Duncan, University of Nebraska at Omaha Criss Library. 
Letterpress Exhibits to Open Art Gallery’s 2016 Calendar, University of Nebraska at Omaha. 
Letterpress Mentor, Carol Dennison, The Reader, January 19, 2016. 

1916 births
1997 deaths
Grinnell College alumni
American printers
American publishers (people)
American artists
Artists from Nebraska
University of Iowa faculty
University of Nebraska Omaha faculty
People from Keokuk, Iowa
Private press movement people